Haggin may refer to:

Surname
B. H. Haggin (1900–1987), American music critic
James Ben Ali Haggin (1822–1914), American attorney, rancher, investor, racehorse owner & breeder
Ben Ali Haggin (1882–1951), American portrait painter and stage designer
John Haggin (1753–1825), early settler  of Kentucky,
William Haggin Perry (1910–1993), owner and breeder of Thoroughbred racehorses

Other
Haggin Museum, an art museum and local history museum in Stockton, California
Haggin Stakes, American Thoroughbred horse race run annually at Hollywood Park Racetrack in Inglewood, California

See also
Hagin
Hanggin (disambiguation)